Hibernian is the first live album by Irish band Tír na nÓg. It was recorded on September 19, 1995 by Alan Hadwin at the Hibernian in Birmingham, released in February 2000 by HTD Records and distributed by Pinnacle Entertainment. The album was re-released in 2001 by Talking Elephant, after HTD closed down.

Track listing

Personnel
Tír na nÓg
Sonny Condell – vocals, guitar, Moroccan pottery drums
Leo O'Kelly – vocals, guitar, violin

Production
 Alan Hadwin – recording, sleeve notes & layout
 Laura Hadwin – front and back cover artworks, sleeve design
 Tim Light – booklet photography
 M – mastering

Release history

References

External links
Talking Elephant official website

Tír na nÓg (band) albums
2001 live albums